Ken Baxter may refer to:
 Ken Baxter (footballer) (1917–1959), Australian rules footballer
 Ken Baxter (businessman) (born 1949), American real estate investor
 Ken Baxter (rugby league) (1927–1987), English rugby league player
 Ken Baxter (trade unionist) (1893–1975), New Zealand printer and trade unionist